The 2007 Wokingham District Council election took place on 3 May 2007 to elect members of Wokingham Unitary Council in Berkshire, England. One third of the council was up for election and the Conservative Party stayed in overall control of the council.

After the election, the composition of the council was:
Conservative 43
Liberal Democrat 11

Election result
The results saw the Conservatives gain 2 seats from the Liberal Democrats to increase their majority on the council. They now had 43 seats on the council after victories in Hillside and Loddon wards, with the Conservative candidate in Loddon, Kirsten Miller, being one of the youngest candidates in Wokingham at the age of 23. Overall turnout in the election was 38.8%.

Ward results

References

2007 English local elections
2007
2000s in Berkshire